Gregory D. Brenneman (born November 26, 1961) is an American businessman. He serves as the chairman of CCMP Capital, an American private equity firm.

Early life
Brenneman was born on November 26, 1961 in Kansas. He graduated from Washburn University of Topeka, Kansas, and was inducted into the school's Sagamore Honor Society in 1982. He also has an M.B.A from Harvard Business School.

Career
Brenneman was a partner at Bain and Company when he joined Continental Airlines as president and chief operating officer.

Brenneman was appointed president and chief executive officer of PwC Consulting in June 2002. His initial plan was to lead the separation of PwCs consulting business from its accounting & audit operations to avoid potential conflicts of interest where it serves as both the financial auditor and the consultant for a single company. However, IPO plans were quickly scrapped after an offer from IBM for $3.5B was received. The IBM PwC Consulting deal closed in October 2002. Brenneman remained with the company during a brief transitional period before returning to a private equity firm he founded in 1994, TurnWorks.

From August 2004 through April 2006, Brenneman was the chief executive officer of the Burger King corporation, directing the company's turnaround efforts. He replaced Brad Blum in that role on August 31, 2004. He subsequently served as the president and CEO of CCMP-owned Quiznos Sub, a fast-food sandwich chain. Reuters said he was hired by Quiznos in Jan. 2007 as a "turnaround expert" due to his work with Burger King and Continental Airlines.

Brenneman is the chairman of CCMP Capital, an American private equity firm. He serves on the board of directors of The Home Depot, Inc. and Automatic Data Processing.

In August 2021, he purchased Porta'Vino restaurants in Houston.

References

External links 
"Can You Pass a C.E.O Tes"t (Interview with Greg Brenneman in the NY Times)

Living people
Harvard Business School alumni
American chief executives of food industry companies
Continental Airlines people
Burger King people
The Home Depot people
Private equity and venture capital investors
1961 births
Bain & Company employees